The Alliance of European Republican Movements (AERM) is a grouping of republican movements from across Europe. It was established in Stockholm in June 2010, after the wedding of Swedish Crown Princess Victoria and Daniel Westling. The aim of the AERM is to provide a network for cross-party republican movements in all the countries of Europe that have a monarch as their head of state, in order to share information, resources and ideas and provide mutual assistance. Each member organisation will retain their autonomous national campaigns however, in recognition of their particular political and constitutional circumstances.

There are currently twelve extant monarchies in Europe. AERM has member organisations in six of these: Denmark, the Netherlands, Norway, Spain, Sweden, and the United Kingdom. It formerly had a presence in Belgium but the Belgian republican movement is no longer represented in AERM.

The AERM protested against the wedding of British Prince William and Catherine Middleton on 29 April 2011 in London, and planned to meet each year thereafter.

Member organisations
Denmark: Republik nu (formerly DRGB or Den Republikanske Grundlovsbevægelse or The Republican Constitutional Movement), launched in 2010.
Netherlands: Republiek. (Formerly New Republican Society (NRG)).
Norway: The Norwegian republican group Foreningen Norge Som Republikk or Norway As Republic Association was founded in March 2011 in Oslo.
Spain: In Spain the member organisation of AERM is Red Inter-Civico Republicana, a group that seeks to draw together the various strands of Spanish republicanism to campaign for the Spanish Third Republic.
Sweden: The Republikanska Föreningen or Swedish Republican Association campaigns for a republic in Sweden based on the Finnish model.
United Kingdom: The main republican organisation in Britain is Republic, reinvented as a campaigning pressure group in 2006.

Former members
Belgium: The Republican Circle (CRK), variously known in the three official languages of Belgium as Cercle républicain, Republikeinse Kring and Republikanischer Kreis, is no longer a member according to AERM's website.

AERM Conventions 
2010: Stockholm, Sweden
2011: London, United Kingdom
2012: Copenhagen, Denmark
2013: Brussels, Belgium
2014: Oslo, Norway 
2015: Amsterdam, Netherlands
2016: Madrid, Spain
2017: Västerås, Sweden
2018: London, United Kingdom
2019: Copenhagen, Denmark
2020: Cancelled because of the COVID-19 pandemic
2021: Utrecht and Amstedam, Netherlands
2022: Oslo, Norway
2023: Stockholm, Sweden

See also
 Dissolution of the union between Norway and Sweden
 Faroese independence movement
 Labour for a Republic
 Monarchies in Europe
 Republic (Faroe Islands)
 Republicanism in Spain
 Republicanism in Sweden
 Republicanism in the Netherlands
 Republicanism in the United Kingdom
 Scottish independence

References

External links 

 

Republicanism in Europe
Republican organizations
Republicanism in Belgium
Republicanism in Denmark
Republicanism in the Netherlands
Republicanism in Norway
Republicanism in Spain
Republicanism in Sweden
Republicanism in the United Kingdom